The Federated States of Micronesia national baseball team is the national baseball team of Federated States of Micronesia. Competes at the South Pacific Games, the team won Bronze at the 2005 event in a competition with six teams.

South Pacific Games
 2005 :  3rd

External links 
 http://websites.sportstg.com/comp_info.cgi?c=0-2663-0-34380-0&pool=1&a=LADDER

National baseball teams
Baseball